Westlake is an unincorporated community in Natchitoches Parish, Louisiana, United States

Notes

Unincorporated communities in Louisiana
Unincorporated communities in Natchitoches Parish, Louisiana